In the Holy Roman Empire, the Great Interregnum (so-called to distinguish it from the shorter period between 924 and 962) was a period of time following the death of Frederick II where the succession of the Holy Roman Empire was contested and fought over between pro- and anti-Hohenstaufen factions. Starting around 1250 with the death of Frederick II, conflict over who was the rightful emperor and King of the Romans would continue into the 1300s until Charles IV of Luxembourg was elected emperor and secured succession for his son Wenceslaus. This period saw a multitude of emperors and kings be elected or propped up by rival factions and princes, with many kings and emperors having short reigns or reigns that became heavily contested by rival claimants.

The long-lasting effects of the Interregnum were primarily the end of centralization of the imperial monarchy and the fragmentation of power towards the princes and prince-electors. The efforts of the Houses of Welf and Hohenstaufen towards expanding the power of the emperor and ensuring a clear line of succession between family members was difficult in this period, with many elections going from one family to another family in a deliberate effort by the electors to prevent a consolidation of power.

Great Interregnum
Following the death of Frederick II, two claimants claimed the Emperorship, Frederick II's son Conrad IV and William of Holland. Conrad's death in 1254 gave William two years of rule but his death in 1256 gave way to a double election in 1257, between Richard of Cornwall and Alfonso X of Castile. Alfonso never set foot in Germany during his lifetime and Richard was crowned in 1257, spending the rest of his reign traveling between England and Germany until his death in 1272. Richard maintained a solid support base in Germany during his reign, keeping the feudal relations of the Hohenstaufens and maintaining some officials of William of Holland. After his death in 1272, there were few obvious candidates to succeed him as multiple dynastic conflicts had splintered the larger dynasty's lands into smaller territories, leaving Ottokar II of Bohemia and Rudolf of Habsburg as the main candidates. Ottokar's ambitions for expanding his territory into Babenberger lands alarmed the princes and they elected Rudolf instead, viewing him as less-threatening and more friendly to their interests.

Rudolf to Albert 
Rudolf started his reign by reclaiming Hohenstaufen land that had been pawned off for money or lost during the previous two decades, in a policy called revindication and during the course of his reign he managed to recover a majority of Hohenstaufen lands and estates. This policy met some resistance in 1274 when a Diet held in Nuremberg decreed that the Count Palatine of the Rhine would be the judge in such cases, diluting some of Rudolf’s power. Rudolf continued the course of Richard, maintaining the Hohenstaufen feudal relationships and expanding on policies started by Richard, notably by overhauling judicial oversight of royal lands to be held by loyal knights and retainers to increase revenues from these lands. Rudolf was frustrated in his attempts to gain control of Babenberger lands in modern-day Austria as his base of support rested on appearing as non-threatening to the other princes. After his death in 1291, Adolf of Nassau was chosen over Rudolf's son Albert due to Albert's attitude towards the electors and the potential threat he might be to them.

Adolf of Nassau had more difficulties in securing his authority with the electors than Rudolf, primarily because the electors desired a weaker ruler that they could control more easily. Adolf granted concessions to the princes but otherwise continued Rudolf's policies of revindication to expand royal lands. Adolf utilized funds from England meant to finance a war with France to instead gain control of Thuringia, which was desired by the electors and other princes due to inheritance disputes. This proved to be his undoing as several princes and electors worked together to challenge Adolf and decide to depose him, a highly controversial move as Adolf's claim was never questioned prior to this incident and the group of princes acted without papal approval. The conflict moved onto the battlefield, where Adolf was killed in battle and Albert of Habsburg, Rudolf's son, was elected as King of the Romans in 1298. Albert however turned on the electors later in his reign, trying to consolidate his family's control of both Thuringia and Bohemia, though ultimately failing as he was murdered by his nephew Johann in 1308 before either could be fully brought under control.

Luxembourgs and Wittelsbachs 

After Albert's murder, the title of King and Emperor was passed onto Henry of Luxembourg, crowned Henry VII in 1308. Henry was chosen due to fears of Habsburg dominance over the other princes with the attempted consolidation of Bohemia and Thuringia. The Luxembourgs were an up and coming family in German politics and Henry found himself in the same position as Adolf of Nassau, having to concede several powers to the princes in order to be elected. But Henry gained considerable prestige by traveling to Rome and being personally crowned by the Pope. This combined with his public renunciation of Thuringian claims got him support from the princes to enfeoff Bohemia to his son John, securing a royal title for his family. Henry died unexpectedly of disease in 1313, leading to another double election, this time between Frederick of Habsburg and Louis of Wittelsbach.

The Luxembourgs and Habsburgs held a similar level of influence due to a gradual collection of territory, so Henry's son John put Louis of Wittelsbach forward as an imperial candidate. Frederick managed to get the imperial insignia and the archbishop of Cologne, the traditional person in charge of coronations, to crown him before Louis could, but Louis was crowned at Aachen, the traditional political capital of the empire. Thus, neither could definitively claim to be emperor and turned to open warfare to resolve the dispute. The two fought with one another from 1313 to 1322, when Frederick was captured and in 1325 Louis attempted to mend the issues between the two by proclaiming Frederick as his co-king and granting the Habsburgs lands in Austria. Later in his reign, Louis would come into conflict with his former support John of Bohemia over the inheritance of Brandenburg, with France and the Pope joining in later and the conflict grew to the point that John's son Charles was elected as anti-king in opposition of Louis in 1346. The next year in 1347 Louis would die of a stroke and Charles would be elected emperor in the same year.

Charles would work fast to deal with both the Habsburgs and Wittelsbachs, offering Brandenburg to the Wittelsbachs to bring them to his side and working with the other princes to formulate the Golden Bull of 1356. This proclamation formalized the positions of the electors and divided them between secular princes and ecclesiastical clergymen. Importantly, the golden bull denied both Austria and Bavaria, important titles of the Habsburgs and Wittelsbachs rivals respectively, from being electors in this new system and granted the secular electorships were given to his allies. Charles can be seen as an end to the Interregnum, having possession of the title of emperor, holding it for several decades, passing it on to his son Sigismund and having no serious anti-king threat to his reign. This breaks the trend of the previous claimants either dying early on into their reigns, losing the title to rival families and having rival claimants violently oppose their rule.

Papacy and the Empire 
The papacy and the empire had a difficult relationship in the period, going back to the 1000’s with the Investiture Crisis. More recently, prior to his death, Frederick received an official deposition notice from Innocent IV at the Council of Lyons. In theory, Innocent IV had the exclusive power to legitimize and de-legitimize the emperor, but in practice this power was only as powerful as those who believed in it. Innocent deposed Frederick, releasing his vassals from their obligations and excommunicating both Frederick and his supporters, but Frederick retained his emperorship and most of his supporters. He responded with a letter of his own to other nobility in Europe to gain support by listing the offenses of the church and clergy. The pope was still somewhat relevant for determining legitimacy despite this, as Henry VII over 50 years later traveled to Rome to be crowned King and was publicly noted for having done so.

Papal Involvement in elections and legitimacy returns in the 1330s with the dispute between Louis Wittelsbach and Frederick Habsburg, with then pope John XXII having denied Louis' election as legitimate, citing that under canon law, legitimacy required papal confirmation of an election. In response, Louis made a declaration at Rhense, declaring that papal interference was no longer necessary if an emperor had sufficient popular support. Because of this, John XXII and his successor Clement VI would look for other imperial candidates to challenge and replace Louis, eventually siding with Charles of Luxembourg, who would shortly thereafter successfully gain the emperorship after Louis' death.

Consequences 

The crisis of the Great Interregnum established an official set of prince-electors as the legal entities that could elect an emperor, and the college of prince-electors as the only source of legitimacy of the German king. Charles' actions in his reign also saw a modest revival of imperial interest in Italy and shifted the center of German politics from central and southern Germany towards the east at Bohemia, and later Austria. At the same time, it set back the progress of centralization achieved under previous dynasties and rulers and severely weakened the authority of the emperor and the king. The lack of central government strengthened the communal movements, such as the Swabian League of Cities, the Hanseatic League and the Swiss Confederacy. It also encouraged increased feuding among the lesser nobility, leading to conflicts such as the Thuringian Counts' War, leading to a general state of near-lawlessness in Germany where robber barons acted unopposed by the nominal system of justice. The role of the papacy in the elections and general governance of the empire were also put into question and would steadily diminish until later emperors would ignore Rome entirely in the election process. Germany was fractured into countless minor states fending for themselves, a condition that would persist into the modern period and, termed Kleinstaaterei, present an obstacle to the modern project of national unification.

See also

Anti-king#Germany
Count-kings
Crisis of the Late Middle Ages
Feudalism in the Holy Roman Empire
Formation of the Old Swiss Confederacy
Guelphs and Ghibellines
Hanseatic League
Imperial immediacy
Interrex
List of German monarchs
Medieval commune
Prince-elector
Städtebund
Translatio imperii
Western Schism

References

Literature 
Comyn, Robert. History of the Western Empire, from its Restoration by Charlemagne to the Accession of Charles V, Vol. I. 1851
Hägermann, Dieter. Interregnum. In: Lexikon des Mittelalters. Band 5. Sp. 468 f.
Jones, Michael, The New Cambridge Medieval History, Vol. VI: c. 1300-c. 1415, Cambridge University Press, 2000
Kaufhold, Martin. Deutsches Interregnum und europäische Politik. Konfliktlösungen und Entscheidungsstrukturen 1230–1280. Hahn, Hannover 2000,  (= Monumenta Germaniae Historica. Schriften. Band 49.
LaRoche, Emanuel Peter. Das Interregnum und die Entstehung der Schweizerischen Eidgenossenschaft. Peter Lang, Bern / Frankfurt am Main 1991 (= Geist und Werk der Zeiten, Band 30).
Kaufhold, Martin. Interregnum. Wissenschaftliche Buchgesellschaft, Darmstadt 2003, .
Prietzel, Malte. Das Heilige Römische Reich im Spätmittelalter. Wissenschaftliche Buchgesellschaft, Darmstadt 2004, .
Kirk, Marianne. «Die kaiserlose, die schreckliche Zeit» – Das Interregnum im Wandel der Geschichtsschreibung, Frankfurt/M. u.a. 2002, 

Wilson, Peter H. “From Little Kings to Big Dynasties.” Section. In Holy Roman Empire - A Thousand Years of Europe's History, 378–90. Penguin Books Ltd, 2017.
Barttlet, Robert. Blood Royal: Dynastic Politics in Medieval Europe. CAMBRIDGE UNIV PRESS, 2021.
Duindam, Jeroen. Dynasties a Global History of Power, 1300-1800. Cambridge, United Kingdom: Cambridge University Press, 2016.
Baker, Darren. Richard of Cornwall: The English King of Germany. S.l.: AMBERLEY PUBLISHING, 2022.
Woodacre, Elena. Queens and Queenship. Leeds: Arc Humanities press, 2021.
Innocent IV. Letter of Deposition, Council of Lyons, 1245. Paul Halsall, trans. Fordham University, accessed electronically April 15, 2022.
Nuremberg Diet. Count Palatine as Judge over the Kings, Decree of the Diet of Nuremberg. Ernest Henderson, trans. Avalon Project, accessed electronically April 15, 2022.
Charles IV Luxembourg. Golden Bull of Emperor Charles IV. Ernest Henderson trans. Avalon Project, accessed electronically April 15, 2022.
Menache, Sophia. Clement V. Cambridge, U.K.: Cambridge University Press, 2002.
Frederick II Hohenstaufen. Letter from Frederick II to the kings of Christendom, 1246. Paul Halsall, trans. Fordham University, accessed electronically April 15, 2022.
“Constitutional Conflicts in the 14th Century.” Encyclopædia Britannica, Encyclopædia Britannica, Inc., https://www.britannica.com/place/Germany/Constitutional-conflicts-in-the-14th-century#ref297176.
Scales, Len. The Shaping of German Identity: Authority and Crisis, 1245-1414. Cambridge University Press, 2015.



13th century in the Holy Roman Empire
14th century in the Holy Roman Empire
Imperial election (Holy Roman Empire)